The Romanian Master of Mathematics and Sciences (formerly known as the Romanian Masters in Mathematics) is an annual competition for students at the pre-university level, held in Bucharest, Romania. The contestants compete individually, in four different sections: mathematics, physics, chemistry and computer science. The participating teams (national and local teams) can have up to four students for each section (plus two coaches: a leader and a deputy leader). The contest follows the same structure as IMO and IPhO and is usually held at the end of February.

History
The first Romanian Master in Mathematics was held in 2008 and has been initiated by Prof. Severius Moldoveanu and Prof. Radu Gologan. In 2010 Physics was also added as a section, therefore the name changed to RMMS. At the beginning, the competition structure had been 4 problems in 5 hours, but also in 2010, it was changed to 6 problems over 2 days, with 4.5 hours of exam each day. The first country that won the competition was the United Kingdom. The 4th edition was held between 23–28 of February 2011 and included also Chemistry and Computer Science. The 5th edition, held in 2012 was only for Physics and Mathematics. 
The current champion team in Mathematics is the United States of America.

Teams reaching the top three in mathematics

* = teams finished equal points

Organizers
The contest is organised at the Tudor Vianu National College of Computer Science in collaboration with the Sector 1 town council. As a host, Tudor Vianu has the right to have its own team entering the contest in each section, thus participating against countries.

References

Mathematics competitions
Physics competitions
Science competitions
Science events in Romania
Annual events in Romania
2008 establishments in Romania
Recurring events established in 2008